The Last Gun is a 1964 Italian Western film directed by Sergio Bergonzelli.  The film is set in 1866 in Arizona where a town is threatened by a bandits, which leads to a former gunfighter to re-equip his weapons for one final shoot out.

Release
The Last Gun was first released in 1964. It was distributed in Italy by Dipa as Jim il Primo . It was distributed in England by British Lion as Killer's Canyon.

Reception
In a retrospective review, Christopher Forsley of PopMatters stated that "the entire film [...] is unfocused". Forsley discussed the female characters in the film, stating that "every female character [...] no matter her age, faces a sustained threat of sexual assault. As demented as that sounds, it's through this unrelenting threat that Bergonzelli's uniquely perverted voice is heard and the film is almost redeemed for its many failures."

See also
 Cameron Mitchell filmography
 List of Italian films of 1964

References

Sources

External links
 

Films directed by Sergio Bergonzelli
1964 Western (genre) films
1964 films
Italian Western (genre) films
1960s Italian films